Tsingymantis is a monotypic genus of frogs in the family Mantellidae. The sole species is Tsingymantis antitra.

Taxonomy
Tsingymantis antitra was described in by Glaw, Hoegg and Vences in 2006. Its taxonomic placement within the family Mantellidae remains uncertain, because it is apparently a basal taxon.

Distribution and habitat
This species is endemic to Ankarana Special Reserve, in northwestern Madagascar, where it lives among the limestone karst.

References

Mantellidae
Endemic frogs of Madagascar
Monotypic amphibian genera
Taxa named by Frank Glaw
Taxa named by Miguel Vences